Martín Alhaja was a Spanish shepherd who aided the Castilian King Alfonso VIII during the Battle of Las Navas de Tolosa in 1212 A.D. Alhaja, who knew the area, to herd his sheep had placed a cow skull on the path that led to the field behind the Moors and onto the battlefield. The Spanish Christian King surprised the Moorish army and defeated them. This was the first significant victory for the Christian Spanish during their reconquest of Spain.

For his assistance, King Alfonso VIII gave Alhaja the title "Cabeza de Vaca", which means "head of a cow". He was awarded a coat-of-arms that included cow skulls in its design. He is the maternal ancestor of explorer Cabeza de Vaca.

See Also 

Ephialtes of Trachis, who had a similar role in the Battle of Thermopylae

References

Shepherds
People from Andalusia